The Free Speech Union (FSU) is a British organisation which advocates freedom of speech. The group was established on 24 February 2020 by British columnist Toby Young. The organisation views itself as countering cancel culture by opposing hostility on Twitter and the withdrawal of some individuals' invitations to speak at some university events.

The Free Speech Union made an unsuccessful legal challenge against Ofcom's COVID-19 guidance. The group has been criticised by journalists and former student members, who believe that the FSU has a right-wing agenda and that its stated aims are misleading.

Campaigns
The organisation was founded to counter cancel culture, and was "established to counter Twitter mobs that drown out opinions they dislike", according to The Times. Its directors say it will be the beginning of a solution to the "censorship problem". Young said that it should take on the "witch-finder generals" and the "enforcers of intellectual conformity and moral dogma". The FSU has written letters to several universities to criticise "no-platforming", in the cases of Selina Todd and Amber Rudd at Oxford University, Caroline Farrow at Exeter University, Richard Dawkins at Trinity College, Dublin, and former Labour MP Chris Williamson at Royal Holloway Debating Society.

The FSU also lobbied against the Hate Crime and Public Order (Scotland) Bill proposed by Scottish Justice Secretary Humza Yousaf of the Scottish National Party. In a submission to the public consultation, prepared by law professor Andrew Tettenborn of Swansea University, the FSU claimed that the bill would be one of the most draconian constraints on free speech in the Western world.

In October 2020, a director of the FSU announced that the Union had begun a lawsuit against Ofcom over its March 2020 "coronavirus guidance", which was published simultaneously with the instantiation of the UK lockdown. In the words of the complainant, the guidance "warns broadcasters to exercise extreme caution before criticising the response by the public health authorities or interviewing any sceptics." He inferred that the guidance was the reason for the lack of public discussion of the Great Barrington Declaration, and questioned the behaviour of SAGE member Susan Michie, who wrote of a show that turned into a discussion of COVID-19 politics that "I'd got prior agreement from BBC Radio 4 about the framing of the item... I was assured that this would not be held as an even-handed debate." A judge dismissed the case and the FSU had to pay £16,732 to cover Ofcom's costs.

In November 2021, the FSU announced that it would be taking legal action against Essex University. The previous year, an independent review commissioned by the university had found that the university had failed to uphold free-speech in its treatment of two female professors, who hold contentious views about transgender people, in December 2019. The university later apologised to both professors. The FSU argued that the university failed to act on the recommendations of the review and stated in their pre-action letter that it is in breach of free-speech law.

After Cambridge University launched an online portal for students to anonymously report microaggressions, the Free Speech Union threatened legal action. The portal was ultimately removed.

In September 2021, the Free Speech Union crowdfunded around £25,000 for the legal fees of a train conductor who had been fired by West Midlands Trains for a Facebook post including the comment "I don't want to live in some sort of alcohol-free Muslim caliphate just to beat Covid-19". The conductor received compensation from West Midlands Trains.

Leadership
Other directors of the union include Douglas Murray, Inaya Folarin Iman, Radomir Tylecote of the Institute of Economic Affairs, Nigel Biggar, and Ian Rons.

The Legal Advisory Council of the FSU consists of sixteen lawyers, among them former High Court judge Sir Patrick Garland, and law professors Andrew Tettenborn and Raymond Wacks.

The Media/PR Advisory Council consists of several journalists including Julia Hartley-Brewer, Allison Pearson and David Rose, as well as University of Cambridge philosophy don Arif Ahmed.

Criticism
Imogen West-Knights, writing for Vice, argued that in setting up the FSU, Young wanted "to be able to slag off [minority groups] to his heart's content". Joel Golby, writing an op-ed for The Guardian, argued that subsequent to his foundation of the FSU, Young was likely to become a "Nigel Farage copycat", adding that "we didn't take Ukip seriously at the start because it was just Robert Kilroy-Silk pouring excess energy from not being on TV any more into saying 'legitimate concerns' a lot... And then, oops, we all woke up and Brexit had happened."

In January 2021, a group of student activists who had joined the Free Speech Youth Advisory Board criticised the way the organisation was run, claiming that they were censured if they disagreed with the group's right-of-centre views. Having been led to believe that it was a grassroots campaign, they commented that it appeared to be an astroturfed front for the Free Speech Union.

In Byline Times, Nafeez Ahmed revealed that Birkbeck College professor Eric Kaufmann, who is an advisor to the FSU, was behind Education Secretary Gavin Williamson's proposal to regulate free speech at English universities.

In September 2022, PayPal shut down the accounts of the Free Speech Union and Toby Young. The account were closed because of breaches of PayPal's acceptable use policy, thought to be because of alleged misinformation about COVID-19 vaccines. PayPal apologised and reversed the decision a few days later.

References

External links
 

2020 establishments in England
Organizations established in 2020
Non-profit organisations based in London
Freedom of speech in the United Kingdom
Civil liberties advocacy groups